Rollin' Stoned is the fourth studio album by American rap rock group Kottonmouth Kings. It was released on October 8, 2002 via Suburban Noize/Capitol Records. Production was handled by Mike Kumagai, Julian Raymond, and members Daddy X and DJ Bobby B. The album peaked at number 51 on the Billboard 200 in the United States.

Track listing

Personnel
Brad "Daddy X" Xavier – vocals (tracks: 2-4, 6-9, 11, 13-22), producer (tracks: 1-6, 8-22), executive producer
Dustin "D-Loc" Miller – vocals (tracks: 2-4, 6-9, 11, 13-22), additional scratches (track 18)
Timothy "Johnny Richter" McNutt – vocals (tracks: 2-4, 6-9, 11, 13-17, 19-22)
Luiz "Lou Dog" Gaez – drums (tracks: 2, 4, 6, 11, 13, 14, 18, 19)
Robert "DJ Bobby B" Adams – scratches, producer (track 18)
Sky Blue Xavier – vocals (track 1)
Will "Sweet Dick" Perry – vocals (tracks: 5, 10, 12)
Hopper – vocals (tracks: 5, 10, 12)
Daniel "The Judge" Rogers – vocals (track 14)
Doug Carrion – guitar (tracks: 3, 8, 9, 11, 13-15, 17-22), bass (tracks: 3, 11, 17, 18)
Brad Gordon – keyboards (tracks: 9, 13, 19, 22)
Scott Koziol – bass (tracks: 8, 9, 13, 15, 20, 22)
Byron McMackin – drums (tracks: 3, 15, 20)
Scott Garrett – drums (tracks: 8, 9, 19)
BJ Smith – percussion (tracks: 13, 22)
Mike Kumagai – producer (tracks: 1-6, 8-17, 19-22), mixing, engineering
Julian Raymond – producer (track 7)
Patrick Shevelin – mixing, engineering
Chris Lord-Alge – mixing (track 7)
Pete Taitague – assistant engineering
Brian "Big Bass" Gardner – mastering
James Droopy Sanderson – artwork
Fabrice Henssens – photography
Alan Karalian – design, layout

Charts

References

External links

2002 albums
Capitol Records albums
Kottonmouth Kings albums
Suburban Noize Records albums
Albums produced by Julian Raymond